In the 2014 Rome Open in tennis, Aljaž Bedene was the defending singles champion, but decided not to compete.

Julian Reister won the title, defeating Pablo Cuevas in the final, 6–3, 6–2

Seeds

  Dušan Lajović (first round)
  Filippo Volandri (semifinals)
  Paolo Lorenzi (first round)
  Andreas Haider-Maurer (first round)
  Malek Jaziri (second round)
  Julian Reister (champion)
  Daniel Evans (first round)
  Potito Starace (second round)

Draw

Finals

Top half

Bottom half

References
 Main Draw
 Qualifying Draw

Rome Open - Singles
2014 Singles
Roma